Oil City is an unincorporated community in Chariton County, Missouri.

References

Unincorporated communities in Missouri